Young Blood is the first extended play (EP) by the American singer Bea Miller. It was her first release after finishing ninth on the second season of The X Factor US, and was released on April 22, 2014, by Syco Music and Hollywood Records. The EP has contributions from producers and songwriters such as Phoebe Ryan, busbee and Jarrad Rogers.

The EP has the singles "Young Blood" and "Fire n Gold".

Singles
The EP's title track, "Young Blood", was released as Miller's first single on April 22, 2014, the same day as the EP's release. The music video was released on July 21, 2014, on Miller's Vevo channel.

The song "Fire n Gold" was released to contemporary hit radio on April 28, 2015, and was the lead single from her first album, Not an Apology.

Commercial performance
Young Blood debuted and peaked at No. 64 on the Billboard 200.

Track listing

Charts

Release history

References

2014 debut EPs
Hollywood Records EPs
Syco Music EPs
Pop rock EPs
EPs by American artists
Bea Miller albums
Pop rock albums by American artists